Round or rounds may refer to:

Mathematics and science
 The contour of a closed curve or surface with no sharp corners, such as an ellipse, circle, rounded rectangle, cant, or sphere
 Rounding, the shortening of a number to reduce the number of significant figures it contains
 Round number, a number that ends with one or more zeroes
 Roundness (geology), the smoothness of clastic particles
 Roundedness, rounding of lips when pronouncing vowels
 Labialization, rounding of lips when pronouncing consonants

Music
 Round (music), a type of musical composition
 Rounds (album), a 2003 album by Four Tet

Places
 The Round, a defunct theatre in the Ouseburn Valley, Newcastle upon Tyne, England
 Round Point, a point on the north coast of King George Island, South Shetland Islands
 Grand Rounds Scenic Byway, a parkway system in Minneapolis 
 Rounds Mountain, a peak in the Taconic Mountains, United States
 Round Mountain (disambiguation), several places
 Round Valley (disambiguation), several places

Repeated activities
 Round (boxing), a time period within a boxing match
 Round (cryptography), a basic crypto transformation
 Grand rounds, a ritual in  medical education and inpatient care
 Round of drinks, a traditional method of paying in a drinking establishment
 Funding round, a discrete round of investment in a business
 Doing the rounds or patrol, moving through an area at regular or irregular intervals
 Round (Theosophy), a planetary cycle of reincarnation in Theosophy
 Round (dominoes), period of play in dominoes in which each player plays a piece or passes
 A circular walk or run like the Bob Graham Round

Other 
 Round (surname)
 Rounds (surname)
 Round shot
 Cartridge (firearms), a single unit of ammunition
 Round steak, a cut of meat
 Cattle

See also
 Circle
 Roundabout
 Around (disambiguation)
 Round and Round (disambiguation)
 Round Hill (disambiguation)
 Roundness (disambiguation)
  OR 
 

es:Ronda